West Dylan Thordson is an American film composer. He is best known for his original scores to Joy, The Jinx: The Life and Deaths of Robert Durst, Foxcatcher and M. Night Shyamalan's Split and Glass.

Selected filmography

Film

Documentaries

References

External links
 

Living people
Place of birth missing (living people)
American film score composers
Year of birth missing (living people)